Raphaël Granier de Cassagnac (born 1 January 1973 in Paris) is a French physicist and writer. He is specialized in nuclear and particle physics. He is a member of the PHENIX experiment at Brookhaven National Laboratory and of the CMS experiment at CERN where he is involved in studying the Quark-Gluon Plasma in ultrarelativistic heavy-ion collisions.

He writes Science Fiction novels, his debut novel was Eternity Incorporated, published in 2011. It was followed by Thinking Eternity in 2014 which won the Prix du Lundi in 2014.

References

External links

1973 births
20th-century French non-fiction writers
20th-century French male writers
French physicists
Living people
People associated with CERN